Susanne Busch (born 9 October 1970) is a German short track speed skater. She competed in three events at the 1998 Winter Olympics.

References

External links
 

1970 births
Living people
German female short track speed skaters
Olympic short track speed skaters of Germany
Short track speed skaters at the 1998 Winter Olympics
Sportspeople from Erfurt